Tischeria quercitella, the oak blotch miner moth, is a moth of the  family Tischeriidae. It has been sighted in North America in Ontario, District of Columbia, Illinois, Kentucky, Massachusetts, Missouri, New Jersey, Ohio, Pennsylvania and Virginia.

The larvae feed on Castanea dentata, Quercus alba, Quercus ilicifolia, Quercus prinus and Quercus velutina. They mine the leaves of their host plant. The mine consists of a distinctive upperside blotch. It is the only species of the oak-feeding group of North American Tischeria species that constructs a nidus as a pupal chamber within the mine.

References

Tischeriidae
Moths described in 1863